Tales from the Tomb is the first studio album by Swedish death metal band Evocation. It was released on 27 April 2007 through Cyclone Empire Records. The album was made available on CD and vinyl.

Track listing

Personnel
Evocation
 Martin Toresson – bass
 Thomas Josefsson – vocals
 Marko Palmén – guitars
 Vesa Kenttäkumpu – guitars
 Janne Kenttäkumpu Bodén – drums, backing vocals

Guest musicians
 Gustaf Jorde – backing vocals on "Veils Were Blown"

Miscellaneous staff
 Dan Seagrave – artwork, cover art
 Karl-Heinz Schuster – layout
 Kristian Wåhlin – logo
 Johan Örnborg – mastering
 Christian Silver – mastering
 Vesa Kenttäkumpu – production, recording, engineering, mixing
 Anton Hedberg – photography

References

External links 
 

2007 debut albums
Evocation (band) albums